The Russian avant-garde was a large, influential wave of avant-garde modern art that flourished in the Russian Empire and the Soviet Union, approximately from 1890 to 1930—although some have placed its beginning as early as 1850 and its end as late as 1960. The term covers many separate, but inextricably related, art movements that flourished at the time; including Suprematism, Constructivism, Russian Futurism, Cubo-Futurism, Zaum and Neo-primitivism. Many of the artists who were born, grew up or were active in what is now Belarus and Ukraine (including Kazimir Malevich, Aleksandra Ekster, Vladimir Tatlin, Wassily Kandinsky, David Burliuk, Alexander Archipenko), are also classified in the Ukrainian avant-garde.

The Russian avant-garde reached its creative and popular height in the period between the Russian Revolution of 1917 and 1932, at which point the ideas of the avant-garde clashed with the newly emerged state-sponsored direction of Socialist Realism.

Artists and designers
Notable figures from this era include:

Journals
 LEF
 Mir iskusstva

Filmmakers

Writers

Theatre directors

Architects

Preserving Russian avant-garde architecture has become a real concern for historians, politicians and architects. In 2007, MoMA in New York City, devoted an exhibition to Soviet avant-garde architecture in the postrevolutionary period, featuring photographs by Richard Pare.

Composers

Many Russian composers that were interested in avant-garde music became members of the Association for Contemporary Music which was headed by Roslavets.

See also

References

Further reading 
 Friedman, Julia. Beyond Symbolism and Surrealism: Alexei Remizov's Synthetic Art, Northwestern University Press, 2010.  (Trade Cloth)
 Nakov, Andrei. Avant Garde Russe. England: Art Data. 1986.
 Kovalenko, G.F. (ed.) The Russian Avant-Garde of 1910-1920 and Issues of Expressionism. Moscow: Nauka, 2003.
 Rowell, M. and Zander Rudenstine A. Art of the Avant-Garde in Russia: Selections from the George Costakis Collection. New York: The Soloman R. Guggenheim Museum, 1981.
 Shishanov V.A. Vitebsk Museum of Modern Art: a history of creation and a collection. 1918–1941. - Minsk: Medisont, 2007. - 144 p.
 “Encyclopedia of Russian Avangard. Fine Art. Architecture Vol.1 A-K, Vol.2 L-Z Biography”; Rakitin V.I., Sarab’yanov A.D., Moscow, 2013
Surviving Suprematism: Lazar Khidekel. Judah L. Magnes Museum, Berkeley CA, 2004 
Lazar Khidekel and Suprematism. Prestel, 2014 (Regina Khidekel, with contributions by Constantin Boym, Magdalena Dabrowski, Charlotte Douglas, Tatyana Goryacheva, Irina Karasik, Boris Kirikov and Margarita Shtiglits, and Alla Rosenfeld)
 Tedman, Gary. Soviet Avant Garde Aesthetics, chapter from Aesthetics & Alienation. pp 203–229. 2012. Zero Books.

External links 
 Why did Soviet Photographic Avant-garde decline?
 Website about russian avant-garde.
 The Russian Avant-garde Foundation
 Thessaloniki State Museum of Contemporary Art - Costakis Collection
 Yiddish Book Collection of the Russian Avant-Garde at the Beinecke Rare Book and Manuscript Library at Yale University
 International campaign to save the Shukhov Tower in Moscow
 Masters of Russian Avant-garde
 Masters of Russian Avant-garde from the collection of the M.T. Abraham Foundation
 Abstraction and Estrangement across the Arts in the Russian Avant-garde: Chapter 2 in The Poetics of the Avant-garde in Literature, Arts, and Philosophy, edited by Slav Gratchev, 2020, Rowman & Littlefield.

 
Modern art
Russian art